The 2017–18 Houston Rockets season was the 51st season of the franchise in the National Basketball Association (NBA), and their 47th in the Houston area. The Rockets acquired star point guard Chris Paul from the Los Angeles Clippers due to a multitude of trades after the 2017 NBA draft on June 28, 2017, as well as for being the team's first under current owner Tilman Fertitta. The Rockets also broke their franchise record for most wins in a season with their 59th win against the New Orleans Pelicans, eventually totalling 65 wins on the season. With a loss by the Warriors on March 29, the Rockets clinched the No. 1 seed for the first time in franchise history, which then followed to clinch the best record in this season following a Raptors loss against the Celtics.

In the playoffs, the Rockets defeated the 8th-seeded Minnesota Timberwolves in the First Round in five games, advancing to the Conference Semifinals, where they defeated the Utah Jazz in five games. They lost the Conference Finals to the eventual NBA champion Golden State Warriors in seven games. During game seven of that series, with the chance to go to the NBA Finals for the first time since 1995, the Rockets lost 101–92 and set an NBA Playoff record by missing 27 straight 3-point shots.

Draft picks

Roster

Standings

Division

Conference

Game log

Preseason

|- style="background:#bfb;"
| 1
| October 3
| @ Oklahoma City
| 
| Eric Gordon (21)
| Mbah a Moute, Tucker (7)
| James Harden (10)
| BOK Center17,733
| 1–0
|- style="background:#bfb;"
| 2
| October 5
| Shanghai Sharks
| 
| Trevor Ariza (18)
| Clint Capela (11)
| Chris Paul (12)
| Toyota Center16,012
| 2–0
|- style="background:#bfb;"
| 3
| October 9
| @ New York
| 
| James Harden (36)
| Capela, Harden (9)
| James Harden (11)
| Madison Square GardenN/A
| 3–0
|- style="background:#bfb;"
| 4
| October 11
| @ Memphis
| 
| James Harden (18)
| Capela, Tucker (9)
| James Harden (9)
| FedExForum13,212
| 4–0
|- style="background:#fbb;"
| 5
| October 13
| San Antonio
| 
| Eric Gordon (27)
| Clint Capela (12)
| James Harden (11)
| Toyota Center17,445
| 4–1

Regular season

|- style="background:#cfc;"
| 1
| October 17
| @ Golden State
| 
| James Harden (27)
| Anderson, Paul (8)
| Chris Paul (11)
| Oracle Arena19,596
| 1–0
|- style="background:#cfc;"
| 2
| October 18
| @ Sacramento
| 
| James Harden (27)
| Clint Capela (17)
| James Harden (9)
| Golden 1 Center17,583
| 2–0
|- style="background:#cfc;"
| 3
| October 21
| Dallas
| 
| James Harden (29)
| Anderson, Capela (10)
| James Harden (7)
| Toyota Center18,055
| 3–0
|- style="background:#fcc;"
| 4
| October 23
| Memphis
| 
| Eric Gordon (27)
| P. J. Tucker (8)
| James Harden (8)
| Toyota Center17,129
| 3–1
|- style="background:#cfc;"
| 5
| October 25
| @ Philadelphia
| 
| Eric Gordon (29)
| Clint Capela (20)
| James Harden (13)
| Wells Fargo Center20,682
| 4–1
|- style="background:#cfc;"
| 6
| October 27
| @ Charlotte
| 
| James Harden (27)
| James Harden (10)
| James Harden (11)
| Spectrum Center17,339
| 5–1
|- style="background:#fcc;"
| 7
| October 28
| @ Memphis
| 
| Ryan Anderson (22)
| Clint Capela (12)
| James Harden (8)
| FedExForum17,033
| 5–2
|- style="background:#fcc;"
| 8
| October 30
| Philadelphia
| 
| James Harden (29)
| Clint Capela (15)
| James Harden (7)
| Toyota Center16,714
| 5–3

|- style="background:#cfc;"
| 9
| November 1
| @ New York
| 
| James Harden (31)
| Clint Capela (13)
| James Harden (9)
| Madison Square Garden18,320
| 6–3
|- style="background:#cfc;"
| 10
| November 3
| @ Atlanta
| 
| James Harden (29)
| Ryan Anderson (8)
| James Harden (11)
| Philips Arena14,087
| 7–3
|- style="background:#cfc;"
| 11
| November 5
| Utah
| 
| James Harden (56)
| P. J. Tucker (9)
| James Harden (13)
| Toyota Center16,914
| 8–3
|- style="background:#cfc;"
| 12
| November 9
| Cleveland
| 
| James Harden (35)
| Clint Capela (13)
| James Harden (13)
| Toyota Center18,055
| 9–3
|- style="background:#cfc;"
| 13
| November 11
| Memphis
| 
| James Harden (38)
| Clint Capela (14)
| James Harden (8)
| Toyota Center18,055
| 10–3
|- style="background:#cfc;"
| 14
| November 12
| @ Indiana
| 
| James Harden (26)
| Clint Capela (17)
| James Harden (15)
| Bankers Life Fieldhouse15,581
| 11–3
|- style="background:#fcc;"
| 15
| November 14
| Toronto
| 
| James Harden (38)
| Clint Capela (11)
| James Harden (11)
| Toyota Center18,055
| 11–4
|- style="background:#cfc;"
| 16
| November 16
| @ Phoenix
| 
| James Harden (48)
| Clint Capela (10)
| Chris Paul (10)
| Talking Stick Resort Arena16,875
| 12–4
|- style="background:#cfc;"
| 17
| November 18
| @ Memphis
| 
| James Harden (29)
| Clint Capela (13)
| James Harden (7)
| FedExForum17,266
| 13–4
|- style="background:#cfc;"
| 18
| November 22
| Denver
| 
| Trevor Ariza (25)
| P. J. Tucker (11)
| Chris Paul (12)
| Toyota Center18,055
| 14–4
|- style="background:#cfc;"
| 19
| November 25
| New York
| 
| James Harden (37)
| Clint Capela (15)
| Chris Paul (13)
| Toyota Center18,055
| 15–4
|- style="background:#cfc;"
| 20
| November 27
| Brooklyn
| 
| James Harden (37)
| James Harden (10)
| Chris Paul (14)
| Toyota Center16,189
| 16–4
|- style="background:#cfc;"
| 21
| November 29
| Indiana
| 
| James Harden (29)
| Clint Capela (13)
| James Harden (10)
| Toyota Center16,760
| 17–4

|- style="background:#cfc;"
| 22
| December 3
| @ L.A. Lakers
| 
| James Harden (36)
| Clint Capela (13)
| James Harden (9)
| Staples Center18,997
| 18–4
|- style="background:#cfc;"
| 23
| December 7
| @ Utah
| 
| James Harden (29)
| Chris Paul (9)
| Chris Paul (13)
| Vivint Smart Home Arena18,306
| 19–4
|- style="background:#cfc;"
| 24
| December 9
| @ Portland
| 
| James Harden (48)
| Clint Capela (10)
| Chris Paul (7)
| Moda Center19,503
| 20–4
|- style="background:#cfc;"
| 25
| December 11
| New Orleans
| 
| Clint Capela (28)
| Chris Paul (9)
| James Harden (17)
| Toyota Center18,055
| 21–4
|- style="background:#cfc;"
| 26
| December 13
| Charlotte
| 
| Chris Paul (31)
| Clint Capela (11)
| Chris Paul (11)
| Toyota Center16,509
| 22–4
|- style="background:#cfc;"
| 27
| December 15
| San Antonio
| 
| Harden, Paul (28)
| Anderson, Capela (10)
| Chris Paul (8)
| Toyota Center18,055
| 23–4
|- style="background:#cfc;"
| 28
| December 16
| Milwaukee
| 
| James Harden (31)
| P. J. Tucker (10)
| Chris Paul (6)
| Toyota Center18,055
| 24–4
|- style="background:#cfc;"
| 29
| December 18
| Utah
| 
| Eric Gordon (33)
| Clint Capela (20)
| Chris Paul (6)
| Toyota Center18,055
| 25–4
|- style="background:#fcc;"
| 30
| December 20
| L.A. Lakers
| 
| James Harden (51)
| Trevor Ariza (11)
| James Harden (9)
| Toyota Center18,055
| 25–5
|- style="background:#fcc;"
| 31
| December 22
| L.A. Clippers
| 
| James Harden (51)
| Anderson, Tucker (10)
| James Harden (8)
| Toyota Center18,055
| 25–6
|- style="background:#fcc;"
| 32
| December 25
| @ Oklahoma City
| 
| James Harden (29)
| Clint Capela (10)
| James Harden (14)
| Chesapeake Energy Arena18,203
| 25–7
|- style="background:#fcc;"
| 33
| December 28
| @ Boston
| 
| James Harden (34)
| P. J. Tucker (10)
| James Harden (9)
| TD Garden18,624
| 25–8
|- style="background:#fcc;"
| 34
| December 29
| @ Washington
| 
| James Harden (20)
| Ryan Anderson (12)
| Chris Paul (6)
| Capital One Arena20,356
| 25–9
|- style="background:#cfc;"
| 35
| December 31
| L.A. Lakers
| 
| James Harden (40)
| Tarik Black (9)
| James Harden (11)
| Toyota Center18,179
| 26–9

|- style="background:#cfc;"
| 36
| January 3
| @ Orlando
| 
| Gerald Green (27)
| Clint Capela (8)
| Chris Paul (13)
| Amway Center18,588
| 27–9
|- style="background:#fcc;"
| 37
| January 4
| Golden State
| 
| Eric Gordon (30)
| Clint Capela (10)
| Chris Paul (9)
| Toyota Center18,055
| 27–10
|- style="background:#fcc;"
| 38
| January 6
| @ Detroit
| 
| Chris Paul (16)
| Clint Capela (11)
| Chris Paul (13)
| Little Caesars Arena18,046
| 27–11
|- style="background:#cfc;"
| 39
| January 8
| @ Chicago
| 
| Gordon, Paul (24)
| Clint Capela (16)
| Gordon, Paul (9)
| United Center17,462
| 28–11
|- style="background:#cfc;"
| 40
| January 10
| Portland
| 
| Chris Paul (37)
| Clint Capela (9)
| Chris Paul (11)
| Toyota Center18,055
| 29–11
|- style="background:#cfc;"
| 41
| January 12
| @ Phoenix
| 
| Chris Paul (25)
| Clint Capela (16)
| Chris Paul (6)
| Talking Stick Resort Arena18,055
| 30–11
|- style="background:#fcc;"
| 42
| January 15
| @ L.A. Clippers
| 
| Gordon, Paul (19)
| Capela, Tucker (7)
| Chris Paul (7)
| Staples Center17,622
| 30–12
|- style="background:#cfc;"
| 43
| January 18
| Minnesota
| 
| Eric Gordon (30)
| P. J. Tucker (9)
| Chris Paul (9)
| Toyota Center18,055
| 31–12
|- style="background:#cfc;"
| 44
| January 20
| Golden State
| 
| Chris Paul (33)
| Ryan Anderson (13)
| James Harden (8)
| Toyota Center18,055
| 32–12
|- style="background:#cfc;"
| 45
| January 22
| Miami
| 
| James Harden (28)
| Clint Capela (8)
| Chris Paul (6)
| Toyota Center18,055
| 33–12
|- style="background:#cfc;"
| 46
| January 24
| @ Dallas
| 
| James Harden (25)
| Clint Capela (13)
| James Harden (13)
| American Airlines Center19,378
| 34–12
|- style="background:#fcc;"
| 47
| January 26
| @ New Orleans
| 
| Chris Paul (38)
| Clint Capela (10)
| James Harden (11)
| Smoothie King Center17,186
| 34–13
|- style="background:#cfc;"
| 48
| January 28
| Phoenix
| 
| James Harden (27)
| Clint Capela (11)
| James Harden (8)
| Toyota Center18,055
| 35–13
|- style="background:#cfc;"
| 49
| January 30
| Orlando
| 
| James Harden (60)
| Clint Capela (13)
| James Harden (11)
| Toyota Center18,055
| 36–13

|- style="background:#cfc;"
| 50
| February 1
| @ San Antonio
| 
| James Harden (28)
| Clint Capela (13)
| James Harden (11)
| AT&T Center18,418
| 37–13
|- style="background:#cfc;"
| 51
| February 3
| @ Cleveland
| 
| Chris Paul (22)
| Capela, Tucker (9)
| Chris Paul (11)
| Quicken Loans Arena20,562
| 38–13
|- style="background:#cfc;"
| 52
| February 6
| @ Brooklyn
| 
| James Harden (36)
| Clint Capela (11)
| Harden, Paul (5)
| Barclays Center15,064
| 39–13
|- style="background:#cfc;"
| 53
| February 7
| @ Miami
| 
| James Harden (41)
| Clint Capela (8)
| Chris Paul (7)
| American Airlines Arena19,600
| 40–13
|- style="background:#cfc;"
| 54
| February 9
| Denver
| 
| James Harden (28)
| Clint Capela (25)
| James Harden (11)
| Toyota Center18,055
| 41–13
|- style="background:#cfc;"
| 55
| February 11
| Dallas
| 
| James Harden (27)
| Clint Capela (11)
| Chris Paul (9)
| Toyota Center18,055
| 42–13
|- style="background:#cfc;"
| 56
| February 13
| @ Minnesota
| 
| James Harden (34)
| Clint Capela (12)
| James Harden (13)
| Target Center18,978
| 43–13
|- style="background:#cfc;"
| 57
| February 14
| Sacramento
| 
| James Harden (29)
| Clint Capela (11)
| James Harden (9)
| Toyota Center18,055
| 44–13
|- align="center"
|colspan="9" bgcolor="#bbcaff"|All-Star Break
|- style="background:#cfc;"
| 58
| February 23
| Minnesota
| 
| James Harden (31)
| Clint Capela (11)
| James Harden (9)
| Toyota Center18,055
| 45–13
|- style="background:#cfc;"
| 59
| February 25
| @ Denver
| 
| James Harden (41)
| James Harden (8)
| James Harden (7)
| Pepsi Center20,044
| 46–13
|- style="background:#cfc;"
| 60
| February 26
| @ Utah
| 
| James Harden (26)
| James Harden (11)
| Chris Paul (7)
| Vivint Smart Home Arena18,306
| 47–13
|- style="background:#cfc;"
| 61
| February 28
| @ L.A. Clippers
| 
| James Harden (25)
| Clint Capela (14)
| Chris Paul (8)
| Staples Center19,068
| 48–13

|- style="background:#cfc;"
| 62
| March 3
| Boston
| 
| Eric Gordon (29)
| Clint Capela (17)
| James Harden (10)
| Toyota Center18,476
| 49–13
|- style="background:#cfc;"
| 63
| March 6
| @ Oklahoma City
| 
| Chris Paul (25)
| James Harden (11)
| P. J. Tucker (6)
| Chesapeake Energy Arena18,203
| 50–13
|- style="background:#cfc;"
| 64
| March 7
| @ Milwaukee
| 
| James Harden (26)
| Clint Capela (8)
| Chris Paul (11)
| BMO Harris Bradley Center17,195
| 51–13
|- style="background:#fcc;"
| 65
| March 9
| @ Toronto
| 
| James Harden (40)
| Clint Capela (13)
| James Harden (4)
| Air Canada Centre20,131
| 51–14
|- style="background:#cfc;"
| 66
| March 11
| @ Dallas
| 
| Eric Gordon (26)
| Tarik Black (9)
| Chris Paul (12)
| American Airlines Center20,394
| 52–14
|- style="background:#cfc;"
| 67
| March 12
| San Antonio
| 
| James Harden (28)
| Capela, Green (9)
| Chris Paul (9)
| Toyota Center18,092
| 53–14
|- style="background:#cfc;"
| 68
| March 15
| L.A. Clippers
| 
| James Harden (40)
| Clint Capela (13)
| James Harden (4)
| Toyota Center18,055
| 54–14
|- style="background:#cfc;"
| 69
| March 17
| @ New Orleans
| 
| James Harden (32)
| Harden, Capela (11)
| James Harden (7)
| Smoothie King Center18,495
| 55–14
|- style="background:#cfc;"
| 70
| March 18
| @ Minnesota
| 
| James Harden (34)
| Clint Capela (12)
| James Harden (12)
| Target Center18,978
| 56–14
|- style="background:#cfc;"
| 71
| March 20
| @ Portland
| 
| James Harden (42)
| Chris Paul (8)
| James Harden (7)
| Moda Center20,012
| 57–14
|- style="background:#cfc;"
| 72
| March 22
| Detroit
| 
| Eric Gordon (22)
| Clint Capela (14)
| Harden, Gordon (5)
| Toyota Center18,055
| 58–14
|- style="background:#cfc;"
| 73
| March 24
| New Orleans
| 
| James Harden (27)
| Clint Capela (16)
| James Harden (8)
| Toyota Center18,055
| 59–14
|- style="background:#cfc;"
| 74
| March 25
| Atlanta
| 
| Gerald Green (25)
| James Harden (10)
| James Harden (15)
| Toyota Center18,055
| 60–14
|- style="background:#cfc;"
| 75
| March 27
| Chicago
| 
| Eric Gordon (31)
| P. J. Tucker (8)
| Chris Paul (10)
| Toyota Center18,055
| 61–14
|- style="background:#cfc;"
| 76
| March 30
| Phoenix
| 
| James Harden (28)
| Capela, Harden (8)
| James Harden (10)
| Toyota Center18,055
| 62–14

|- style="background:#fcc;"
| 77
| April 1
| @ San Antonio
| 
| James Harden (25)
| Clint Capela (10)
| James Harden (8)
| AT&T Center18,418
| 62–15
|- style="background:#cfc;"
| 78
| April 3
| Washington
| 
| James Harden (38)
| Capela, Harden (10)
| James Harden (9)
| Toyota Center18,055
| 63–15
|- style="background:#cfc;"
| 79
| April 5
| Portland
| 
| Chris Paul (27)
| Clint Capela (10)
| James Harden (7)
| Toyota Center18,055
| 64–15
|- style="background:#fcc;"
| 80
| April 7
| Oklahoma City
| 
| James Harden (26)
| P. J. Tucker (10)
| Harden, Paul (9)
| Toyota Center18,055
| 64–16
|- style="background:#cfc;"
| 81
| April 10
| @ L.A. Lakers
| 
| Chris Paul (22)
| Clint Capela (12)
| James Harden (10)
| Staples Center18,997
| 65–16
|- style="background:#fcc;"
| 82
| April 11
| @ Sacramento
| 
| Gerald Green (31)
| Tarik Black (11)
| Joe Johnson (5)
| Golden 1 Center17,583
| 65–17

Playoffs

|- style="background:#cfc;"
| 1
| April 15
| Minnesota
| 
| James Harden (44)
| Clint Capela (12)
| James Harden (8)
| Toyota Center18,055
| 1–0
|- style="background:#cfc;"
| 2
| April 18
| Minnesota
| 
| Chris Paul (27)
| Clint Capela (16)
| Chris Paul (8)
| Toyota Center18,055
| 2–0
|- style="background:#fcc;"
| 3
| April 21
| @ Minnesota
| 
| James Harden (29)
| Clint Capela (11)
| James Harden (7)
| Target Center18,978
| 2–1
|- style="background:#cfc;"
| 4
| April 23
| @ Minnesota
| 
| James Harden (36)
| Clint Capela (17)
| Chris Paul (6)
| Target Center18,978
| 3–1
|- style="background:#cfc;"
| 5
| April 25
| Minnesota
| 
| Clint Capela (26)
| Clint Capela (15)
| James Harden (12)
| Toyota Center18,055
| 4–1

|- style="background:#cfc;"
| 1
| April 29
| Utah
| 
| James Harden (41)
| Clint Capela (12)
| James Harden (7)
| Toyota Center18,055
| 1–0
|- style="background:#fcc;"
| 2
| May 2
| Utah
| 
| James Harden (32)
| Clint Capela (11)
| James Harden (11)
| Toyota Center18,055
| 1–1
|- style="background:#cfc;"
| 3
| May 4
| @ Utah
| 
| Gordon, Harden (25)
| Clint Capela (8)
| James Harden (12)
| Vivint Smart Home Arena18,306
| 2–1
|- style="background:#cfc;"
| 4
| May 6
| @ Utah
| 
| Chris Paul (27)
| Clint Capela (15)
| Chris Paul (6)
| Vivint Smart Home Arena18,306
| 3–1
|- style="background:#cfc;"
| 5
| May 8
| Utah
| 
| Chris Paul (41)
| Chris Paul (7)
| Chris Paul (10)
| Toyota Center18,055
| 4–1

|- style="background:#fcc;"
| 1
| May 14
| Golden State
| 
| James Harden (41)
| Chris Paul (11)
| James Harden (7)
| Toyota Center18,055
| 0–1
|- style="background:#cfc;"
| 2
| May 16
| Golden State
| 
| Gordon, Harden (27)
| Capela, Harden (10)
| Ariza, Paul (6)
| Toyota Center18,119
| 1–1
|- style="background:#fcc;"
| 3
| May 20
| @ Golden State
| 
| James Harden (20)
| Chris Paul (10)
| James Harden (9)
| Oracle Arena19,596
| 1–2
|- style="background:#cfc;"
| 4
| May 22
| @ Golden State
| 
| James Harden (30)
| P. J. Tucker (16)
| Harden, Paul (4)
| Oracle Arena19,596
| 2–2
|- style="background:#cfc;"
| 5
| May 24
| Golden State
| 
| Eric Gordon (24)
| Clint Capela (14)
| Chris Paul (6)
| Toyota Center18,055
| 3–2
|- style="background:#fcc;"
| 6
| May 26
| @ Golden State
| 
| James Harden (32)
| Clint Capela (16)
| James Harden (9)
| Oracle Arena19,596
| 3–3
|- style="background:#fcc;"
| 7
| May 28
| Golden State
| 
| James Harden (32)
| P. J. Tucker (12)
| James Harden (6)
| Toyota Center18,055
| 3–4

Transactions

Trades

Free agency

Re-signed

Additions

Subtractions

Awards

References

External links
 

Houston Rockets seasons
Houston Rockets
Houston Rockets
Houston Rockets